Port Phillip is a large bay in southern Victoria, Australia.  It is named after British colonial administrator Arthur Phillip and adjoins the city of Melbourne.  

It may also locally refer to
 City of Port Phillip, local government area in Melbourne
 Port Phillip Association, company formed in June 1835 to settle land in what would become Melbourne
 Port Phillip Bay (Western Shoreline) and Bellarine Peninsula Ramsar Site
 Port Phillip Channel Deepening Project
 Port Phillip District, historical administrative division of the Colony of New South Wales, later to become the core of the state of Victoria
 Port Phillip District Special Surveys, part of land settlement legislation in 1841
 Port Phillip Gazette, Melbourne newspaper 1838-1851
 Port Phillip Heads Marine National Park
 Port Phillip Herald, Melbourne newspaper est. 1840
 Port Phillip Prison, Truganina, Victoria
 Port Phillip Protectorate, 1839 attempt to protect Aborigines
 Port Phillip Arcade, Melbourne, a shopping arcade in the city of Melbourne

See also
 Port Philip, Nova Scotia

.